"Cruel Summer" is a song by American singer-songwriter Taylor Swift, from her seventh studio album, Lover (2019). Swift wrote the song with St. Vincent and producer Jack Antonoff. "Cruel Summer" combines synth-pop, industrial pop, and electropop; the production incorporates synthesizers and distorted vocals manipulated by robotic voice effects. Lyrically, it is about a narrator falling for a summer romance while experiencing intense, painful events in her personal life.

"Cruel Summer" was acclaimed by critics, who lauded the production as catchy and ethereal. Several critics deemed it an album highlight and one of Swift's best songs. Upon its release, "Cruel Summer" debuted and peaked at number 29 on the US Billboard Hot 100. It peaked inside the top 20 on singles charts of Malaysia, New Zealand, and Singapore. The song was included in 2019 year-end lists by Billboard and Rolling Stone. It received its first-ever live performances on the Eras Tour (2023).

Background

The song's title was an easter egg in the music video for "You Need to Calm Down", the second single from Taylor Swift's seventh studio album Lover (2019). "Cruel Summer" is the second track on Lover, which was released on August 23, 2019.

Termed by Swift as a song about a "summer romance", "Cruel Summer" sees Swift describing an uncertain romantic relationship, with elements of pain and desperation in it. It portrays the challenges faced by pop stars in the public spotlight. The vulnerability of the song's lyrics has drawn comparisons to "Delicate", the fifth track on Swift's 2017 album Reputation.

In the audio recordings from Lover Secret Sessions, a series of album-listening parties hosted by Swift, she explained that:

Billboard'''s Heran Mamo opined that the song's lyrics see Swift "wrestling with strong feelings", where they paint "the picture of an emotional night out". Justin Styles of The Ringer wrote that the song tells a "more humanizing version" of Swift's "ill-fated period three years ago", adding that Swift sings about "falling in love with current boyfriend Joe Alwyn while her public life was in shambles". Anna Gaca, writing for Pitchfork, called the song a "drama-free delight" with "magnetic pink glow". The Spinoff pointed out that Swift's vocals in "Cruel Summer" are "most notable for the modern country cadence".

Composition

"Cruel Summer" has been described as a dreamy, melancholy synth-pop, industrial pop and electropop song with a "ranting" bridge, driven by a pulsating, throbbing "synth-swirl", robotic voice effects, distorted vocals and a hook that consists of a long, high, fluctuating "ooooh". It is played in the key of A major and follows a chord progression of A–Cm–Fm–D. "Cruel Summer" was written by Swift, Jack Antonoff and St. Vincent, with a "burbling" production from Swift and Antonoff; St. Vincent also took part in the production of the song by playing the guitar. Ravens & Chimes/Bleachers member, Michael Riddleberger, plays drums on the track.

 Critical reception 
"Cruel Summer" was widely acclaimed by music critics, with particular praise towards its production and bridge. In his "critic's pick" review, Jon Caramanica of The New York Times commended the song for its "thick, ethereal" pop production and praised Swift's signature vocal motifs such as the "question-mark syllables" and the "hard-felt smears". Mikael Wood of the Los Angeles Times proclaimed "Cruel Summer" to be the best song off of Lover, stating "Agony and ecstasy as only Swift at her best can render them: 'It's new, the shape of your body / It's blue, the feeling I've got,' she sings in a razor-sharp, industrial-pop banger about finding love in a hopeless place. The part of the bridge where Swift shrieks about the devil might be the punkest thing you'll hear all year".

Alex Abad-Santos, writing for Vox, listed "Cruel Summer" as one of his top-three best Lover tracks, writing that the song is an "aquatic robot bop" featuring "wobbly" synths. The Spinoff stated that Swift "absolutely pulls it off", comparing it to the Bananarama's 1984 hit of the same name. Writing for The Ringer, Justin Sayles praised the song as a "better rebuke of her personal drama than anything on her last album", and added that Swift "shakes off the bad vibes" with "Cruel Summer"; Sayles named it Swift's "most infectious song since that run of singles from 1989", and opined that song "sets the tone" for the "warmer, more inviting vibes" of Lover. Also calling it "infectious", Nick Levine of NME termed the track as a "brilliant pop song". Natalia Barr, writing for Consequence of Sound, highlighted Swift's vocal delivery in the song's bridge ("He looks up, grinning like a devil"), calling it "simultaneously funny, agonizing, and thrilling, and needs to be created into a viral YouTube loop immediately". Barr further labeled "Cruel Summer" as one of the "most perfect" pop songs of 2019.

"Cruel Summer" featured on year-end lists of the best songs of 2019 by Rolling Stone (4th) and Billboard (10th). In a list ranking the best bridges of the 21st-century, Billboard placed "Cruel Summer" at number 11. The song has ranked highly on critics' rankings of Swift's songs in her discography, appearing on such lists by Rob Sheffield of Rolling Stone (2021) at number 11 out of 229, and Hannah Mylrea of NME (2020), number 6 out of 161. In 2021, Clash critics picked the song as one of Swift's 15 best, citing its "highly addictive" song structure. Exclaim!'s Alex Hudson and Megan LaPierre (2022) ranked it second on another list of the best 20 songs by Swift, praising St. Vincent's artistic input that complements Swift's.

 Commercial performance 
Upon the release of Lover, "Cruel Summer" debuted and peaked inside the top-30 of several official charts worldwide. In the United States, "Cruel Summer" debuted and peaked at number 29 on the Billboard Hot 100 chart, dated September 7, 2019; it is one of the seven tracks from Lover'' to reach the top-40 of the Hot 100. The song stayed on the Hot 100 for two weeks as an album track. "Cruel Summer" debuted at number eight in Singapore and number 10 in Sweden, and reached the top 20 in Ireland, Malaysia and New Zealand. It further peaked inside the top 30 in Australia, Canada and the United Kingdom.

Usage in media 
American singer-songwriter Olivia Rodrigo posted a piano cover of "Cruel Summer" across her social media in April 2020, of which Swift took notice and responded affirmatively. Rodrigo further interpolated the song in her 2021 single "Deja Vu," however Rodrigo did not give songwriting credits until similarities were noticed between the two songs.

Personnel 
Credits are adapted from Tidal.

 Taylor Swift – vocals, songwriter, producer
 Jack Antonoff – producer, songwriter, programmer, recording engineer, drums, keyboards, vocoder
 St. Vincent – songwriter, guitar
 Michael Riddleberger – drums
 John Hanes – mix engineer
 Serban Ghenea – mixer
 Laura Sisk – recording engineer
 John Rooney – assistant recording engineer
 Jon Sher – assistant recording engineer

Charts

Certification

References 

2019 songs
American synth-pop songs
Industrial songs
Electropop songs
Songs written by Taylor Swift
Songs written by Jack Antonoff
Songs written by St. Vincent (musician)
Song recordings produced by Taylor Swift
Song recordings produced by Jack Antonoff
Taylor Swift songs